Tête-à-la-Baleine Airport  is located  southwest of Tête-à-la-Baleine, Quebec, Canada.

Airlines and destinations

References

Certified airports in Côte-Nord